Chute! is a British children's comedy television series broadcast on CBBC and presented by Ross Lee. It was originally broadcast between September and December 2007 and was cancelled after its first series. Lee played a version of himself trapped inside a rubbish tip at BBC Television Centre containing approximately 83,000 video cassettes covering the floor of the room.

Overview
Trapped in a rubbish tip with approximately 83,000 video cassettes, Lee's sole purpose seems to be to sort through the videos and share them with whoever comes to visit him (the viewer in this case – the episodes are shown through their point of view in first-person). According to the series' title theme, the viewer is a child that fell down the chute while taking part in a tour of the BBC Television Centre. Down in the rubbish tip is also a monster who, at the end of every episode, drags away and "eats" the viewer. Although the monster can't be seen directly a green tentacle with purple spots is draped over the side of the camera to indicate the monster's presence.

Footage shown in the series varies, from clips of other BBC programmes, numerous unusual news stories as reported by BBC News, to even several viral videos that were popular at the time. In the Sarah Jane episode, The Mysterious Ticking Noise from The Potter Puppet Pals was shown, marking its first broadcast on television.

Programmes and clips that made frequent appearances on the show included:
 Stitch Up
 Raven
 Dick and Dom in Da Bungalow
 Cheese Rolling Championships
 BBC News Headlines
 BBC Foul Ups (bloopers)
 Match of the Day, where unusual sporting events are highlighted
 The Flashing Blade, a series with the original soundtrack removed and voice-over artists provide the new soundtrack. The re-voiced clips were taken from On the Waterfront and written by Russell T Davies.

Episodes

Recurring segments
Throughout the show there are gags which are featured in every or most shows:

Lee would refer to his family and go, "Ah mummy pie. I bet you she'll be looking for me right now". Then it goes briefly to a scene showing Lee's mother enjoying herself (e.g. playing a video game, dancing in the park).
During some point in the show Lee would grab the keyboard and start singing a song, often out of tune. If he is about to cry or is crying while he does this, his song includes the lyric, "Rossington don't cry". This is put to an end when the viewer grabs a bucket and throws it over Lee's head, muffling his voice.
In the wall is a tiny gap between two bricks which Lee first looks through before telling the viewer to look through. On the other side is an event which takes place before the viewer is caught looking. Someone then pokes them in the eye which has enough force to knock them back into the tip. On numerous occasions, it is the viewer who looks through first, then gestures for Ross to look.
Sometimes Lee would go slightly crazy and a segment of Reet Petite by Jackie Wilson would play in the background. This happens randomly.
When the monster takes away the viewer, Lee gets a camera and takes a picture of the viewer. He then tells the viewer to give his love to the viewer's family and gives two random pieces of advice. At the very end of the program, after the credits, a picture of the viewer is shown, followed by a burp which implies that the viewer has been eaten.
 Occasionally, the lights in the Chute go out, then when they come back on, something strange has happened.(e.g. his clothes would be off and he'd be furiously masturbating, etc.)

References

External links

 at Bungalow Online

2000s British children's television series
2007 British television series debuts
2007 British television series endings
BBC children's television shows
Clip shows